The Millersville Marauders are the athletic teams that represent Millersville University of Pennsylvania, located in Millersville, Pennsylvania, in NCAA Division II intercollegiate sports.

The Marauders are members of the Pennsylvania State Athletic Conference (PSAC) for all eighteen varsity sports. Millersville have been members of the PSAC since its foundation in 1951.

Varsity teams

List of teams

Men's sports (7)
Baseball
Basketball
Golf
Football
Soccer
Tennis
Wrestling

Women's sports (11)
Basketball
Cross country
Field hockey
Golf
Lacrosse
Soccer
Softball
Swimming and diving
Tennis
Track and field
Volleyball

Phil Walker played basketball for the Millersville Marauders. He was a member of world champion 1977–78 Washington Bullets. 

Chas McCormick played baseball for the Millersville Marauders. McCormick set Millersville career records in hits, runs, RBIs, and triples, became the Pennsylvania State Athletic Conference's all-time hits leader, was named All-PSAC East four times, was named the PSAC East Athlete of the Year, and was named an All-American.

National championships

Team

Club sports

Ice Hockey (D2)
Program started in 1978, competing in the American College Hockey Association (ACHA) Division 2. Members of the DVCHC (1991-1999), MACH, GNCHC (2009-2014), CSCHC (2014-present)
1991-1992 DVCHC Co-Champions
1991-1992 ranked #8 nationally in ACHA rankings #1
1992-1993 DVCHC Champions
1992-1993 ACHA National Tournament invitation hosted by Iowa State University, but unable to participate
1993-1994 DVCHC Regular Season Champions
1993-1994 DVCHC Runner-Up
1993-1994 ranked #8 in ACHA national rankings (ranking #1 of the season)
1993-1994 ranked #4 in ACHA national rankings (mid-season ranking)
1993-1994 ranked #10 in ACHA national rankings (final of the season)
1993-1994 ACHA National Tournament participant hosted by Siena College; March 9-12-1994; Pool D-Millersville, Southern Connecticut State, Calvin College. Others at nationals- Ferris State(champions), Drexel, Tennessee, Colorado State(Runner-up), Liberty, Siena, Kentucky, Illinois, Stanford.  
1994-1995 DVCHC Champions
1996-1997 DVCHC Runner-Up
1998-1999 DVCHC Runner-Up
1999-2000 ranked #9 in ACHA North East region
2001-2002 ranked #14 in ACHA North East region
2011–2012 GNCHC Runner-up
2011-2012 GNCHC Western Division Champions
2011-2012 GNCHC Regular Season Champions
2012-2013 GNCHC Runner-Up
2012-2013 Northeast region First team Defense-Sean Nielsen
2013-2014 GNCHC Regular Season Champions
2013-2014 GNCHC Runner-Up
2014-2015 season: received ranking votes in final ranking period in ACHA South East Region
2014–2015 CSCHC Regular Season Champions
2015-2016 season: received ranking votes in final ranking period in ACHA South East Region
2015-2016- Andrew Quintois- ACHA Division 2 Academic All- American
2018-2019 season: ranked #17 in ACHA southeast region (ranking period #2), #18 in ACHA southeast region (ranking period #1
2018-2019- ACHA D2 Academic All Americans, Cody Leisey and Kyle Milosek
2019-2020 season: ranked #14 in ACHA southeast region (ranking period #1)
2021-2022 season: #18 ACHA southeast (ranking period 1), #19 southeast region (ranking period 2), #13 southeast (ranking period 3), #17 southeast (ranking period 4), #20 southeast (ranking period 5), #16 southeast (ranking period 6), #19 southeast (ranking period 7), #18 southeast (ranking period 8), #18 southeast (ranking period 9), #20 southeast (final ranking period)
2022-2023 season: #15 ACHA southeast (ranking period 1) #15 (period 2), #12 (period 3), #16 (period 4), #15 (period 5), #18 (period 6), #18 (period 7), #17 (period 8), #17 (final ranking period)
2022-2023 CSCHC Runner-Up
2022-2023 Southeast Region Second Team, Forward- Cole McCulley

Ice Hockey (D3)
Established 2021, playing in the DVCHC, part of the College Hockey Federation (CHF)
2021-2022-ranked #10 week #9 of Atlantic region, ranked #9 in Atlantic region in week 10 rankings,  ranked #11 in Atlantic region in week 17 rankings, ranked #10 week 19 of Atlantic region, ranked #10 week 21 of Atlantic region
2022-2023-ACHA D3

Baseball
2018-2019 NCBA Division 3 District 1 South Champions
2018-2019 NCBA Division 3 World Series Champions
2019-2020 season: moved to NCBA Division 2
2019-2020 season: ranked #15 in NCBA national poll.

Men's & Women's Rugby

Men's Club Lacrosse

Men's and Women's Cycling Club

Men's Running Club
Previously Men's Cross Country - 1981 Division II National Champions) (and Track & Field)

Individual sports

Field hockey
 2014 Division II National Champions

Lacrosse
 1982 AIAW Division III national champion

Gallery

References

External links